True Tone may refer to:

 True Tone Records (US label) — a 1950s record label based in New Orleans, Louisiana
 True Tone Records (Australian label) — An Australian record label established in the 1980s
 True Tone (iPhone) — a display technology in iPhone 8 and newer
 Truetone — a format medium used mainly for cellphone ringtones